Engineer Francisco Escárcega Márquez (died 1938) was a builder of railroads in Mexico and fought in the Mexican Revolution. He was born in Tlaxcala, Tlaxcala, and opened up areas in southern and eastern Mexico with railways. The city and municipality of Escárcega in the state of Campeche are named after him.

Year of birth missing
1938 deaths
20th-century Mexican engineers
People of the Mexican Revolution
People from Tlaxcala City
Victims of aviation accidents or incidents in Mexico
Mexican people in rail transportation